Szczukwin  is a village in the administrative district of Gmina Tuszyn, within Łódź East County, Łódź Voivodeship, in central Poland. The village dates back to at least the 16th century.

References

Szczukwin